Ahmed Jumah Jaber (born 29 December 1983) is a Qatari long-distance runner who specializes in the marathon.

Notable results include a 38th place at the 2004 Olympic Games, a 23rd place at the 2005 World Half Marathon Championships, a fifth place at the 2006 Asian Games, and a 29th place at the 2007 World Road Running Championships.

His personal best times are 28:40.96 minutes in the 10,000 metres, achieved in June 2006 in Neerpelt; 1:02:08 hours in the half marathon, achieved in October 2007 in Udine; and 2:14:48 hours in the marathon, achieved in April 2004 in the Hamburg Marathon.

International competitions

References

1983 births
Living people
Qatari male marathon runners
Qatari male long-distance runners
Olympic athletes of Qatar
Athletes (track and field) at the 2004 Summer Olympics
Athletes (track and field) at the 2006 Asian Games
World Athletics Championships athletes for Qatar
Asian Games competitors for Qatar